Victorella is a genus of bryozoans in the family Victorellidae.

Species 
The following species are recognised:
 Victorella araceae Vieira, Migotto & Winston, 2014
Victorella bengalensis Annandale, 1908
Victorella bergi Abrikosov, 1959
 Victorella continentalis Braem, 1911
 Victorella muelleri (Kraepelin, 1887)
 Victorella pavida Saville Kent, 1870
 Victorella pseudoarachnidia Jebram & Everitt, 1982
 Victorella soulei d'Hondt, 1976
Victorella symbiotica Rousselet, 1907

References 

Bryozoan genera
Ctenostomatida
Taxa named by William Saville-Kent